The 1980 Avon Championships of Chicago  was a women's tennis tournament played on indoor carpet courts at the International Amphitheatre  in Chicago, Illinois in the United States that was part of the 1980 Avon Championships Circuit. It was the ninth edition of the tournament and was held from January 21 through January 27, 1980. First-seeded Martina Navratilova won the singles title and earned $40,000 first-prize money.

Finals

Singles
 Martina Navratilova defeated  Chris Evert-Lloyd 6–4, 6–4
 It was Navratilova's 3rd singles title of the year and the 37th of her career.

Doubles
 Billie Jean King /  Martina Navratilova defeated  Sylvia Hanika /  Kathy Jordan 6–3, 6–4

Prize money

See also
 Evert–Navratilova rivalry

References

External links
 International Tennis Federation (ITF) tournament edition details
 Tournament draws

Avon Championships of Chicago
Avon Championships of Chicago
Avon Championships of Chicago
Avon Championships of Chicago
Avon